Recaldo Bassue (born 10 October 1965) is a Kittitian cricketer. He played in one List A and two first-class matches for the Leeward Islands in 1989/90.

See also
 List of Leeward Islands first-class cricketers

References

External links
 

1965 births
Living people
Kittitian cricketers
Leeward Islands cricketers